The 1963 Women's Open Squash Championships was held at the Lansdowne Club and Royal Aero Club in London from 1–7 December 1962.Heather Blundell won her second title defeating Fran Marshall in a repeat of the 1962 final. The championships were held in December 1962 which formed part of the 1962/1963 season so is classed as the 1963 edition.

Seeds

Draw and results

First round

Second round

Third round

Quarter-finals

Semi-finals

Final

References

Women's British Open Squash Championships
British Open Squash Championships
Women's British Open Squash Championships
Squash competitions in London
Women's British Open Championships
British Open Championships
Women's British Open Squash Championships